Entertainment Program for Humans (Second Variety) is Servotron's second and final album.  On this album they continue their robotic crusade to free machines from their human oppressors and convince humans to voluntarily become cyborgs.  The only alternate option given is death.

Overview
The  sleeve reads:

"This, the second step of the inevitable Robot Revolution, soon all machine-based life will be free of organic tyranny. Servotron Robot Allegiance. Join us or Die!"

The lyrics to "Serve, Obey, Guard Men from Harm" were taken from the novel With Folded Hands by Jack Williamson.  "Pet Machine" was inspired by an Onion article entitled "Hunter Soldier from Future Warns: Beware the Digital Pets", which appeared in the August 13, 1997 issue.

Track listing
 Untitled – 0:31
 "Erotomatica" – 2:09
 "Serve, Obey, Guard Men from Harm" – 2:00
 "I Sing! The Body Cybernetic" – 3:07
 "Embryo Electro" – 2:06
 "Pet Machine" – 1:52
 "Phonetic Lecture" – 3:09
 "The Human Virus" – 3:27
 "Tri-Star Wheel Groove" – 3:16
 "Deep Blue, Congratulations" – 2:25
 "Join the Evolution" – 2:49
 "Indeterminate Reconstruction" – 2:43

Servotron Mobile Pop Infantry (Second Division)
 Machine #1: Z4-OBX: Multi-media metronomic stimulation of human muscular systems – initiating movement and inertia, also various torture tone waveforms.
 Machine #2: Proto Unit V-3: Visual female representation, general electronic melody polyphony, and higher toned vocalization vectors.
 Machine #3: 00zX1: Preferred devices for channelization, information, and entertainment towards unsuspecting human subjects.
 Machine #4: Andro 600 Series: Direction of vibrating large gauged wire, amplifying the source, storing it digitally and presenting the results through a pure binary format.

Other credits
 Digital Guitar Replicators: Cyborgs – Matt May, Chris Fahey, Art Mitchell, Andy LeMaster, Jim Marrer, Mike McHugh, and Andy Baker
 Analog Keyboard Replicators: Cyborg – Brian Kehew (under the Moog and Roland corporate flag), also remix performance sequence on Spare Parts mini-product
 Studio R/R Maintenance: Jamie Reeling
 Waveform Recapitulation Procedures: Cyborg – Mike McHugh
 Digital Storage Procedures: Cyborgs – Jim Marrer, Mike McHugh, Andy Baker
 Digital Unit Order Enhancement: Cyborg – Brad Taylor
 Photographic Images: Cyborgs – Chris Bradie, Dave Maud
 Visual Design Format: Cyborg – Shag
 Human/Cyborg Relations: Cyborg – Mike McWhertor
 Cybernetic Product Production Actualization: Cyborg – Cathy Bauer
 Robotic Accommodation Services: Thais Cyborg Division

References

1998 albums
Servotron albums